Enduro3 is India's first and only adventure race. It is organized by an NEF (National Education Foundation) an organization based in Pune. Enduro3 is an adventure inspiring ascent of team spirit, creating youthfulness in every age and exposing the participants to the pristine beauty of the Western Ghats

NECC-NEF Enduro3 has the distinction of being India's first and only adventure race. It has been attracting increasing participation across varied age groups since its inception in 2003. From an initial registration of 48 teams the participation has grown to 200 teams of adventure and nature lovers coming together from Metros and small towns. In just a decade of the event NEF enduro3 has left an indelible foot print and created an incomparable experience for adventure lovers. The challenge only gets tougher as the teams get bigger. We derive our strength from the continuous, firm and motivating support we continue to receive from National Egg Co-ordination Committee (NECC) and Vencobb. The firm believe of NECC NEF Enduro3 that adventure has no gender restriction but all it requires is opportunity, has caused it to introduce the compulsory participation of minimum one female member in each team.

Categories
The race is conducted once a year and is held in different categories. Some of the categories are:
 Open
 IT (Information Technology) (All members need to be employed in the IT industry)
 Corporate (All members need to be employed in the corporate world)
 Amateur
 Collegian (All members need to be College going)
 Junior (All members need to be School going)
 40+ (All members need to be of the age 40 and above)
 Doctors (All members need to be a doctor)
 Media (All members need to be working with the media industry)
 Teachers (All members need to be a Teacher)
 Family (All members should belong to same family)

Each of the above category is further divided into following 2 categories
 Mixed: Male and Female members in the team
 All Female: All female members in the team

Each team comprises 3 team members. In which a female member is necessary.

Activities
The race comprises a mix of the following activities:
 Trekking: The distance and route varies as per the category.
 Cycling: The distance and route varies as per the category.
 River crossing: This is usually done in the night and at the end of it there is usually a few hours of resting time.
 Rappelling: This activity is only for OPEN and Amateur category.
 Paddling: This activity should be done by all the three members of the team.
 Navigation
 Kayaking

References

External links
Official Website 

Adventure racing